Tomella is a genus of sea snails, marine gastropod mollusks in the family Clavatulidae.

This name is no longer valid as it is a junior homonym of Tomella Robineau-Desvoidy, 1830 (order Diptera). It has been replaced by Tomellana (Wenz, 1943).

Species
Species brought into synonymy
 Tomella hupferi Strebel, 1912: synonym of Tomellana hupferi (Strebel, 1912) 
 Tomella leschkei Strebel, 1912: synonym of Tomellana leschkei (Strebel, 1912)
 Tomella pfefferi Strebel, 1912: synonym of Clavatula pfefferi (Strebel, 1912)

References

Clavatulidae